The following is a list of sports teams that either are currently or were previously based in Cleveland, Ohio, USA. Teams still active in Cleveland are listed in bold.

Baseball

Active
Cleveland Guardians, Major League Baseball (1901–present)

Defunct
Cleveland Forest Citys, National Association (1871–1872)
Cleveland Spiders, National League (1879–1884, 1889–1899)
Cleveland Blues, American Association (1887–1888)
Cleveland Infants, Players' League (1890)
Cleveland Bearcats, American Association (1914)
Cleveland Spiders, American Association (1915)
Cleveland Tate Stars, Negro National League (1922)
Cleveland Browns, Negro National League (1924)
Cleveland Elites, Negro National League (1926)
Cleveland Hornets, Negro National League (1927)
Cleveland Tigers, Negro National League (1928)
Cleveland Cubs, Negro National League (1931)
Cleveland Stars, East-West League (1932)
Cleveland Giants, Negro National League (1933)
Cleveland Red Sox, Negro National League (1934)
Cleveland Bears, Negro American League (1939–1940)
Cleveland Buckeyes, Negro American League (1943–1948, 1950)

Basketball

Men's basketball

Active
Cleveland Cavaliers, National Basketball Association (1970–present)
Cleveland Charge, NBA G League (established 2001, moved to Cleveland 2021)

Defunct
Cleveland Rosenblums, American Basketball League (1925–31)
Cleveland Chase Brassmen, National Basketball League (1943–44)
Cleveland Allmen Transfers, National Basketball League (1944–46)
Cleveland Rebels, Basketball Association of America (1946–47)
Cleveland Pipers, American Basketball League (1961–1962)

Women's basketball

Defunct

Cleveland Rockers, Women's National Basketball Association (1997–2003)

College

Active
Cleveland State Vikings -- 17 Varsity (7 men's, 9 women's, 1 coed)
Cleveland State Vikings men's basketball 
Cleveland State Vikings women's basketball 
Cleveland State Vikings men's soccer
Case Western Reserve Spartans -- 19 Varsity (10 men's, 9 women's)
Case Western Reserve Spartans football

Defunct
Ohio Chiropody (1929–41)

American Football

Active
Cleveland Browns, All-America Football Conference (1946–1949) National Football League (1950–1995, 1999–present)
Cleveland Fusion, Women's Football Alliance (2002–present)

Defunct/relocated
Cleveland Tigers (NFL) APFA (1920), originally named as the Cleveland Indians in 1916, renamed in 1921
Cleveland Indians (NFL 1931), league-sponsored team that only played on the road
Cleveland Bulldogs NFL (1924–1925) (1927), named as the Cleveland Indians in 1923
Cleveland Panthers AFL (1926)
Cleveland Rams AFL (1936) NFL (1937–1942) (1944–1945) (now known as the Los Angeles Rams)
Cleveland Thunderbolts AFL (Arena) (1992–1994), relocated from Columbus, Ohio
Cleveland Crush, Legends Football League (2011–13)
Cleveland Gladiators, Arena Football League (2008, 2010–2020)

Ice hockey

Active
Cleveland Monsters, American Hockey League (2007–present)

Defunct/relocated
Cleveland Indians, International Hockey League (1929–34)
Cleveland Falcons, IHL & AHL (1934–37)
Cleveland Barons, American Hockey League relocated to Jacksonville, Florida (1937–73)
Cleveland Crusaders, World Hockey Association (1972–76)
Cleveland Barons, NHL (1976–78)
Cleveland Lumberjacks, IHL (1992–2001)
Cleveland Barons, American Hockey League relocated to Worcester, Massachusetts(2001–06)
Cleveland Jr. Barons, NAHL (2005–06)

Roller Derby

Active
Burning River Roller Derby, Women's Flat Track Derby Association (2006-Present)
Cleveland Men's Roller Derby Guardians, Men's Roller Derby Association (2013-Present)

Rugby league

Cleveland Rugby League, North American Rugby League (2021-Present)

Rugby union

Active

Cleveland Rovers RFC, USA Rugby (1978–present)
Cleveland Women's RFC, Iron Maidens (2003 - present)
Cleveland Crusaders RFC, (2015-present)

Soccer

Active
Cleveland Crunch, Major League Indoor Soccer (1989-present)
Cleveland SC, National Premier Soccer League (2018–present)

Defunct/relocated
Cleveland Stokers, North American Soccer League (1967–68)
Cleveland Stars, American Soccer League (1972–73) (name change from Cleveland Stars to Cleveland Cobras before 1974 season commenced)
Cleveland Cobras, American Soccer League (1974–81)
Cleveland Force, MISL (1978–88)
Cleveland Force, MISL (2002–2005) (name change from Cleveland Crunch back to Cleveland Force in 2002, when NPSL became the MISL)
Cleveland City Stars, USL First Division (2006–09)
Cleveland Internationals, USL PDL (2004–10)
Cleveland Freeze, Professional Arena Soccer League (2013–2014)
AFC Cleveland, National Premier Soccer League (2012–2017)

Softball

Defunct
Cleveland Jaybirds, American Professional Slow Pitch League (1977–78)
Cleveland Stepien's Competitors, American Professional Slow Pitch League (1979)
Cleveland Stepien's Competitors, North American Softball League (1980)
Cleveland Competitors, United Professional Softball League (1982)

Indoor professional team tennis

Defunct
Cleveland Nets (featured Björn Borg & Martina Navratilova), World Team Tennis (1974–77)

See also
Sports in Cleveland

Sports teams
 
Lists of sports teams in the United States
Sports teams in Ohio
Ohio sports-related lists